Ágnes Konkoly (born 23 July 1987) is a Hungarian model, wedding planner and beauty pageant titleholder who was crowned Miss Universe Hungary 2012 and represented her country in the Miss Universe 2012 pageants.

Early life
Ágnes is a Wedding Planner in Hungary.

Miss Supranational Hungary 2011
Ágnes competed at Miss Supranational 2011 and she placed on top 20 semi-finalists.

Miss Universe Hungary 2012 & Miss Universe 2012
Ágnes Konkoly has been crowned "Miss Universe Hungary 2012" at the grand coronation night of Beauty Queen 2012 at the TV2 studios in Budapest on Saturday night of 9 June 2012. In the Miss Universe 2012, Konkoly had reached the top 10, which is the highest placement, to date, for Hungary at the pageant.

References

External links
 Miss Universe Hungary official website

1987 births
Living people
Miss Universe 2012 contestants
Hungarian female models
Hungarian beauty pageant winners
Models from Budapest